Allam Narayana is a Telugu language journalist, poet, writer, columnist and he also worked as chief editor of Namaste Telangana. Now he is working as the first ever chairman of  Telangana Press Academy. He is also the founder and  president of Telangana journalist union. He belongs to Perike (Puragiri Kshatriya) caste.

References

Indian male journalists
Living people
Journalists from Telangana
Year of birth missing (living people)